Neerkumizhi is a 1965 Indian Tamil-language film directed by K. Balachander in his directorial debut. It portrayed the stories of patients and staff in a hospital setting. The film is based on Balachander's play of the same name. It was released on 23 October 1965. The film was remade in Telugu in 1969 as Chiranjeevi.

Plot 

Sethu, an orphan is a patient who is constantly playing pranks on the other hospital patients, the nurse in-charge and the doctors. A romantic bond develops between a young doctor, Indra and another patient, a football player, Arun much to the chagrin of her father, the senior-most doctor in the hospital. The football player has a greedy brother who tries to arrange for his sibling to be killed. How Sethu, on learning that he is terminally ill cherishes the short time he has to live and takes it upon himself to unite the lovers forms the rest of the story.

Cast 
 Nagesh as Sedhu
 Sowcar Janaki as Dr. Indra
 V. Gopalakrishnan as Arun
 Major Sundarrajan as Dr. Balakrishnan
 Jayanthi as the nurse in-charge
 I. S. R. as patient
 S. N. Lakshmi
 Shoba as nurse

Production 
Neerkumizhi marked the directorial debut of K. Balachander who earlier worked as a screenwriter and it was based on his stage play of the same name. The film was produced by A. K. Velan under Thirumalai Films. Cinematography was handled by Nimay Ghosh, and the art direction by Ranganna. A. K. Velan who saw the play decided to adapt it as a film and insisted Balachander to direct the film adaptation to which he agreed despite initial reservations due to his lack of knowledge about film direction. Sowcar Janaki, Nagesh, Major Sundarrajan and V. Gopalakrishnan, who were part of the play, returned to the film adaptation. Balachander said that he was advised by friends and relatives to change the title but he was adamant and kept the title.

Soundtrack 
The music was composed by V. Kumar, in his debut. Balachander wanted Sirkazhi Govindarajan to sing the song "Aadi Adangum" as he felt that "his emphasis on certain words and letters always produced the effect required." The title song is based on "The Green Leaves of Summer".

Release and reception 
Neerkumizhi was released on 23 October 1965, during Diwali day. Ananda Vikatan, in a review dated 14 November 1965, said that despite its few flaws, the film could be watched once for Nagesh. Writing in Sport and Pastime, T. M. Ramachandran named it his favourite Diwali release of the year because "it blazes a new trail in screen entertainment", while calling it better than the original play. Kalki praised the film for its story and Nagesh's performance.

References

External links 

1960s Tamil-language films
1965 directorial debut films
1965 films
Films directed by K. Balachander
Films scored by V. Kumar
Films with screenplays by K. Balachander
Films set in hospitals
Indian films based on plays
Tamil films remade in other languages